Charny station is a Via Rail station in Lévis, Quebec, Canada. It is located at 2326 rue de la Gare in the borough of Charny. It is staffed and is wheelchair-accessible.  The station is served by one train per day in each direction on the Montreal–Quebec line Corridor service. The station was once a stop on the Montreal–Gaspé train until 2013, and the Ocean until 2014, when that service moved its local stop to Sainte-Foy station.

External links

Via Rail stations in Quebec
Transport in Lévis, Quebec
Buildings and structures in Lévis, Quebec